David William Worsley Norris (born 1 May 1946) is a former English first-class cricketer who played for Cambridge University in 1967 and 1968.

David Norris attended Harrow School, where he captained the First XI, before going up to Selwyn College, Cambridge. He was Cambridge's regular wicket-keeper for the 1967 and 1968 seasons, gaining his blue in each year.

References

External links
 

1946 births
Living people
People from Hampstead
People educated at Harrow School
Alumni of Selwyn College, Cambridge
English cricketers
Cambridge University cricketers